Anisacate is a genus of South American tangled nest spiders first described by Cândido Firmino de Mello-Leitão in 1941.

Species
 it contains four species:

Anisacate fragile Mello-Leitão, 1941 – Argentina
Anisacate fuegianum (Simon, 1884) – Chile, Argentina
Anisacate f. bransfieldi (Usher, 1983) – Falkland Is.
Anisacate tigrinum (Mello-Leitão, 1941) – Argentina

References

External links

Amaurobiidae
Araneomorphae genera
Spiders of South America
Taxa named by Cândido Firmino de Mello-Leitão